Alan Gallay is an American historian. He specializes in the Atlantic World and Early American history, including issues of slavery. He won the Bancroft Prize in 2003 for his The Indian Slave Trade: the Rise of the English Empire in the American South, 1670-1717.

Life
He graduated from University of Florida, and earned an M.A. and Ph.D. from Georgetown University.

Gallay has taught at the University of Notre Dame, University of Mississippi, Western Washington University, Harvard University and the University of Auckland, as a Fulbright Lecturer. He previously held the Warner R. Woodring Chair in Atlantic World and Early American History, and was Director of The Center for Historical Research at Ohio State University.
Twice he taught for the American Heritage Association in London.

He currently holds the Lyndon B. Johnson Chair of U.S. History at Texas Christian University.

Awards
 Andrew W. Mellon Faculty Fellow in the Humanities, Harvard University 1990-1991
 J. William Fulbright Lecturer in Colonial American History, University of Auckland, Auckland, New Zealand 1992
 National Endowment for the Humanities Fellowship for College Teachers and Independent Scholars 1990–1991, 1997-1998
 2003 Bancroft Prize
 2004 Washington State Book Award

Works
 
 
 
 
 
 Colonial and Revolutionary America, Prentice Hall 2010, 
 "Forgotten Story of Indian Slavery", Race and History, 2003
Walter Ralegh:  Architect of Empire.  Basic Books, 2019. 
"Defining the European Frontier City in Early Modern Asia:  Goa, Macau, and Manila," in Frontier Cities: Encounters at the Crossroads of Empire, eds., Jay Gitlin et al. University of Pennsylvania Press, 2012.

References

External links
"Review of Books: The Indian Slave Trade, The William and Mary Quarterly, July 2003

21st-century American historians
American male non-fiction writers
Living people
University of Florida alumni
Georgetown University alumni
University of Notre Dame faculty
University of Mississippi faculty
Western Washington University faculty
Harvard University faculty
Academic staff of the University of Auckland
Ohio State University faculty
Year of birth missing (living people)
Bancroft Prize winners
21st-century American male writers